Jason Tunks (born May 7, 1975 in London, Ontario, Canada) is a Canadian former  discus thrower who represented Canada in the Olympics three times.
 
Tunks was inducted into the London (Ontario) Sports Hall of Fame in 2012, the Canadian Sports Hall of Fame in 2014, and the Ontario Sports Hall of Fame in 2017.

Personal Bests 
 Discus throw - 67.88m (222-8) - ACU, Abilene, Texas, May 14, 1998 - National Record
 Shot put - Outdoor: 19.06m (62' 6½) - Austin, Texas, April 5, 1997          Indoor: 18.97m (62' 3) - Blacksburg, Virginia, February 23, 2001

Major events 

Olympics

Atlanta 1996 - 33rd - 55.84 m (183.20 ft)

Sydney 2000 - 6th - 65.80 m (215.88 ft)

Athens 2004 - 15th - 61.21 m (200.82 ft)

IAAF World Championships in Athletics

1997 World Championships in Athletics at Athens - 9th - 62.30 m (204.40 ft)

1999 World Championships in Athletics at Seville - 20th - 60.20 m (197.51 ft)

2001 World Championships in Athletics at Edmonton - 9th - 63.79 m (209.28 ft)

2003 World Championships in Athletics at Paris - 11th - 62.21 m (204.10 ft)

2005 World Championships in Athletics at Helsinki - 8th - 63.77 m (209.22 ft)

Commonwealth Games

1998 Commonwealth Games at Kuala Lumpur - 3rd - 62.22 m (204.13 ft)

2002 Commonwealth Games at Manchester - 2nd - 62.61 m (205.41 ft)

2006 Commonwealth Games at Melbourne - 2nd - 63.07 m (206.92 ft)

Pan American Games

1999 Pan American Games at Winnipeg - 3rd - 61.75 m (202.59 ft)

2003 Pan American Games at Santo Domingo - 1st - 63.70 m (208.99 ft)

World Cup in Athletics

2002 World Cup at Madrid - 5th - 62.89 m (206.33 ft)

Goodwill Games

1998 Goodwill Games at Uniondale, New York - 4th - 62.53 m (205.15 ft)

2001 Goodwill Games at Brisbane - 7th - 61.70 m (202.43 ft)

Progression 

Bold is personal best.

1994 - 58.76 m (192.78 ft) - July 14

1995 - 58.66 m (192.45 ft) - July 1

1996 - 63.86 m (209.51 ft) - May 18

1997 - 65.20 m (213.91 ft) - April 12

1998 - 67.88m (222.70 ft) - May 14

1999 - 65.54 m (215.03 ft) - May 13

2000 - 66.28 m (217.45 ft) - May 6

2001 - 67.70 m (222.11 ft) - June 9

2002 - 66.50 m (218.18 ft) - January 28

2003 - 66.55 m (218.34 ft) - April 26

2004 - 66.15 m (217.03 ft) - May 19

2005 - 66.59 m (218.47 ft) - June 11

2006 - 66.50 m (218.18 ft) - February 25

2015 - 60.08m
(197.36) - February 21

See also
 Canadian records in track and field

References

External links 

 
 Athletics Canada profile

1975 births
Living people
Athletes from London, Ontario
Canadian male discus throwers
Athletes (track and field) at the 1998 Commonwealth Games
Athletes (track and field) at the 2002 Commonwealth Games
Athletes (track and field) at the 2006 Commonwealth Games
Athletes (track and field) at the 1996 Summer Olympics
Athletes (track and field) at the 2000 Summer Olympics
Athletes (track and field) at the 2004 Summer Olympics
Athletes (track and field) at the 1999 Pan American Games
Athletes (track and field) at the 2003 Pan American Games
Olympic track and field athletes of Canada
SMU Mustangs men's track and field athletes
Pan American Games track and field athletes for Canada
Commonwealth Games medallists in athletics
Commonwealth Games silver medallists for Canada
Commonwealth Games bronze medallists for Canada
Pan American Games medalists in athletics (track and field)
Pan American Games gold medalists for Canada
Pan American Games bronze medalists for Canada
Competitors at the 1998 Goodwill Games
Competitors at the 2001 Goodwill Games
Medalists at the 1999 Pan American Games
Medalists at the 2003 Pan American Games
Medallists at the 1998 Commonwealth Games
Medallists at the 2002 Commonwealth Games
Medallists at the 2006 Commonwealth Games